{{DISPLAYTITLE:Cmin}}

Cmin is a term used in pharmacokinetics for the minimum blood plasma concentration reached by a drug during the time interval between administration of two doses. This definition is slightly different from Ctrough, the concentration immediately prior to administration of the next dose. Cmin is the opposite of Cmax, the maximum concentration that the drug reaches. Cmin must be above certain thresholds, such as the minimum inhibitory concentration (MIC), to achieve a therapeutic effect.

In most cases Cmin is directly measurable. At steady state the minimum plasma concentration can also be calculated using the following equation:

S: salt factor
F: bioavailability
D: dose
k: elimination constant
ka: absorption constant
Vd: volume of distribution
τ: dosing interval

Cmin is also an important parameter in bioavailability and bioequivalence studies, it is part of the pharmacokinetic information recommended for submission of investigational new drug applications.

References

Pharmacokinetic metrics